Steve Edge is an Australian former rugby league footballer who played in the 1970s and 1980s. A New South Wales Blues representative  he played in the St. George Dragons' 14th and 15th grand final wins and captained the Parramatta Eels to their 1st, 2nd and 3rd premierships.

Regarded as one of the most successful captains under the limited tackle rule, Steve Edge played in a remarkable eleven grand finals in all grades during his career. He holds a unique record in Australian rugby league history as the only man to captain two clubs to Grand Final premiership success.

Club career

St George Dragons

Steve Edge was graded with the St George Dragons in 1972 and that year played in the club's premiership winning third grade side.

He became a regular first grader from 1974 and played in the 1975 Grand Final  side that lost to the Eastern Suburbs Roosters. Edge captained the 1977 Dragons' side, playing in the historic  1977 drawn Grand Final and subsequent replay victory the following week. Edge battled for his first grade spot in 1978 and 1979 but found his best form to play in Saints'  1979 Grand Final  winning side captained by Craig Young.

Parramatta Eels

In 1980 Edge signed with the Parramatta Eels under coach Jack Gibson and captained the Eels to three consecutive Grand Final wins from 1981 to  1983. Edge was regarded as a fine on-field leader, never an overly flashy player with the ball. He had to overcome a serious eye injury (detached retina and punctured iris) to take his place in the  1984 Grand Final and retired after his club’s narrow 6-4 loss to the Canterbury Bulldogs.  In 1993, Edge was made a life member of the Parramatta club.
In 2002, Edge was inducted into Parramatta's hall of fame.

Representative career
Edge toured New Zealand with a Combined Sydney side in 1976. He was selected as New South Wales' Hooker in the inaugural Rugby League State of Origin of 1980.

References

External links
http://www.showroom.com.au/dragons/dragonshistory Dragons History site
http://www.stateoforigin.com.au/soogame/PlayerDetails.aspx?Pid=121 State of Origin Player Detail

1951 births
Living people
Australian rugby league players
St. George Dragons players
Parramatta Eels players
New South Wales Rugby League State of Origin players
Rugby league hookers
Rugby league players from Sydney